John Nelson Williams (born 11 May 1968) is an English former professional footballer who played as a forward from 1990 until 2009.

He notably played in the Premier League for Coventry City. He played in the Football League for Swansea City, Notts County, Stoke City, Wycombe Wanderers, Hereford United, Walsall, Exeter City, Cardiff City, York City, Darlington and Kidderminster Harriers, as well as in Non-league for Cradley Town, Bath City, Redditch United, Evesham United, Weston-super-Mare, Stourbridge, Willenhall Town and Boldmere St. Michaels.

Playing career
Williams started his footballing career at his local club Cradley Town in 1990. After impressing in the lower leagues he attracted the attention of Football League sides and joined Welsh side Swansea City in 1991. After having a decent season with Swansea he move on up to Coventry City the following season. He spent three years with the sky blues making 80 league appearances, the most he would acquire in his career. Williams' early goal against Middlesbrough on 15 August 1992 was only the second goal ever scored in the newly formed FA Premiership (the goal came in the ninth minute of the game which was approximately four minutes after Brian Deane's goal against Manchester United on the opening day of the new season). Whilst at Coventry Williams had loan spells at Notts County, Stoke City and at his old club Swansea City. He left Coventry in 1995 and joined new league side Wycombe Wanderers to start a somewhat nomadic career. After two years with the chairboys he moved on to unsuccessful spells at Hereford United and Walsall. Williams then went on to have a new club every season starting with Exeter City in the 1997–98 season. He went on to play for Cardiff City, York City, Darlington, two seasons with Swansea City his third spell at the club and his final Football League side Kidderminster Harriers. Known as the "flying postman" due to his speed and career before football, when playing for Kidderminster he famously scored against Wolves in the FA Cup 3rd round only for his goal to be equalised in the final minutes.

Following the end of his professional career Williams has gone on to have a similar nomadic career in non-league football. These clubs are Bath City, Redditch United, Evesham United, Weston-super-Mare, Stourbridge, Willenhall Town and most recently Boldmere St. Michaels. This has taken his total number of clubs to 22.

He joined Willenhall Town managed by Mel Eves, in September 2007. In August 2008, Williams, now aged 40 scored a hat-trick for Boldmere St Michaels against Shifnal Town.

Personal life
John has since worked as a youth and community worker in Birmingham whilst keeping links with the game as an agent with a Sports management company. His company 'Flying Postman productions' also produces football themed evening entertainments.
At the 1992 Football League Cup Final at Wembley Stadium he claimed the £10,000 pound first prize when he won the Rumbelows Sprint Contest in a time of 11.49 seconds beating amongst others Leigh Jenkinson and Efan Ekoku.

Career statistics
Source:

A.  The "Other" column constitutes appearances and goals in the Football League Trophy.

References

External links
 

1968 births
Living people
Footballers from Birmingham, West Midlands
English footballers
Association football forwards
Cradley Town F.C. players
Swansea City A.F.C. players
Coventry City F.C. players
Notts County F.C. players
Stoke City F.C. players
Wycombe Wanderers F.C. players
Hereford United F.C. players
Walsall F.C. players
Exeter City F.C. players
Cardiff City F.C. players
York City F.C. players
Kidderminster Harriers F.C. players
Bath City F.C. players
Redditch United F.C. players
Weston-super-Mare A.F.C. players
Stourbridge F.C. players
Gloucester City A.F.C. players
Willenhall Town F.C. players
Darlington F.C. players
Premier League players
English Football League players
Evesham United F.C. players
Boldmere St. Michaels F.C. players